Steven Earl Johnston (born September 28, 1972), best known as Stevie Johnston, is an American professional boxer and a two-time former WBC lightweight champion.

Amateur career 
Johnston had a storied amateur career, compiling an amateur record of 260–13.  Some of his highlights include:
 1989 lost at Lightweight in the United States Championships to Shane Mosley
 1990 United States Amateur champion at Light Welterweight
 1990 2nd place at Light Welterweight at the World Championships in Lima, Peru; losing to Hector Vinent of Cuba.
 1991 Silver medalist at the USA Sports festival beating Shane Mosley by decision, and losing to Terron Millett by decision
 1991 Light Welterweight Gold Medalist at the Pan-American Games in Havana, Cuba. Results were:
 Mark Leduc (Canada) won on points
 Luiz da Silva (Brazil) won by forfeit
 Edgar Ruiz (Mexico) won on points
 1992 2nd place at Light Welterweight at United States Amateur Championships, losing to Shane Mosley.
 1992 finished 2nd at the Olympic Trials in Worcester, MA, attempting to qualify as a Light Welterweight. Results were:
 Mark Lewis won on points
 Terron Millett won on points
 Vernon Forrest lost on points, Johnston then lost again to Forrest in the Box-Offs in Phoenix.

Professional career 
Known as "Lil' But Bad", Johnston turned pro in 1993 and fought for the WBC Lightweight Title against Jean Baptiste Mendy in 1997, winning a close split decision.  Johnston defended the title three times before losing the belt to Cesar Bazan in 1998 in a close decision.  In 1999 he won a rematch against Bazan in another close decision.  He defended the title four times, including a victory over Angel Manfredy, but lost the belt in a loss to José Luis Castillo in 2000 via majority decision.  The loss was declared the 2000 Upset of the Year by Ring Magazine, as Castillo was relatively unknown at the time and Johnston was thought to be over the hill.  It wasn't until a couple years later that the world would know how good of a fighter Castillo was.  Later that year, in an attempt to regain the belt, Johnston rematched Castillo.  In a bizarre ending, Johnston was originally declared the winner by Majority decision.  Several minutes later it was discovered that Judge Ken Morita's scorecard (originally 115-114 Johnston) had been added incorrectly and should have read 114-114, thus making the bout a draw and allowing Castillo to retain his title.  This was to be Johnston's last shot at a major title.

He lost his next big fight, a WBC Lightweight Title Eliminator in 2003 to contender Juan Lazcano, a stunning 11th-round TKO loss.  Prior to the loss, the durable Johnston had never been stopped.  After the loss, Johnston was inactive for more than two years due to injuries suffered in a car accident later that year. "I'm lucky to be alive, never mind fighting," Stevie explained. "I went through the windshield, woke up in the hospital, and ended-up with more than 100-stitches in my face."  Johnston came back in 2005 and in 2006 took on former 140 lbs WBA world title holder Vivian Harris and was dominated.  Johnston was down twice in the 1st round and once in rounds 4 and 7, losing in a 7th-round TKO. In 2007 he was stopped by Rolando Reyes.

In 2008, Johnston suffered another defeat by way of KO at the hands of a taller and younger Edner Cherry.  A left jab followed immediately by a right cross which landed squarely on Johnston's chin and knocked him down with only 30 seconds left in the 10th and final round.  Making matters worse, Johnston slammed the back of his head against the canvas on the way down, and was unconscious for several minutes after the count.

Professional boxing record

References 
 

1972 births
Living people
Boxers at the 1991 Pan American Games
Pan American Games gold medalists for the United States
Boxers from Denver
Winners of the United States Championship for amateur boxers
World boxing champions
American male boxers
Pan American Games medalists in boxing
Light-welterweight boxers
Medalists at the 1991 Pan American Games